Rufus Hardy (December 16, 1855 – March 13, 1943) was a United States representative of the Democratic Party from the state of Texas.

Early years

Hardy was born Monroe County, Mississippi, to George Washington and Pauline J. (Whittaker) Hardy.  The family moved to Millican, Texas, in 1861.

Hardy enrolled at Somerville Institute in Noxubee County, Mississippi, in 1871, and received his L.L.B. from the University of Georgia in 1875.  In 1876, he opened his law practice in Navasota, Texas, and moved to Corsicana, Texas, in 1878.

Career in public service

From 1880 to 1884 he served as a prosecuting attorney of Navarro County, Texas.  He served as District Attorney for the Texas 13th Judicial District 1884–1888, and as District Judge of the same district 1888–1896.  Hardy was represented Texas in the United States House of Representatives 1907–1923.  Upon retirement from Congress, Hardy returned to private practice in Corsicana.

Personal life

In 1881, Hardy was married to Felicia E. Peck.  He died in Corsicana on March 13, 1943, and is buried in Oakwood Cemetery.  Mrs. Hardy followed him in death just 17 days later and is buried by his side.

Fraternal memberships

Benevolent and Protective Order of Elks
Knights of Pythias
Phi Delta Theta

Bibliography

References

External links
 

1855 births
1943 deaths
People from Monroe County, Mississippi
People from Corsicana, Texas
County district attorneys in Texas
Texas state court judges
University of Georgia alumni
Democratic Party members of the United States House of Representatives from Texas
People from Brazos County, Texas